Katherine Kiernan Maria Mulgrew (born April 29, 1955) is an American actress and author. She is best known for her roles as Captain Kathryn Janeway on Star Trek: Voyager and Red on Orange Is the New Black. She first came to attention in the role of Mary Ryan on the daytime soap opera Ryan's Hope. Mulgrew is the recipient of a Critics' Choice Award, a Saturn Award, and an Obie Award, and has also received Golden Globe Award and Primetime Emmy Award nominations. She is an active member of the Alzheimer's Association National Advisory Council and the voice of Cleveland's MetroHealth System. Beginning in 2021, Mulgrew reprised her role as Janeway in the animated series Star Trek: Prodigy.

Early life
Mulgrew was born in 1955 in Dubuque, Iowa, to Thomas James "T.J." Mulgrew Jr., a contractor, and Joan Virginia Mulgrew (née Kiernan), an artist and painter. She was the second of eight children. She attended Wahlert High School in Dubuque. Mulgrew was born with a full set of teeth.

At age 17, Mulgrew was accepted at the Stella Adler Conservatory of Acting in New York, conjoined with New York University in New York City. Mulgrew left NYU after one year. During this time, to earn money while in New York, Mulgrew worked as a waitress.

Career

Earlier career (1975–1994) 
Mulgrew's early career included portraying Mary Ryan for two years on the ABC soap Ryan's Hope (1975). She became a fan favorite and remained associated with the show long after its cancellation. Mulgrew remained friends with former co-star Ilene Kristen and presented a special Soap Opera Digest Award to Ryan's Hope creator Claire Labine in 1995. While in Ryan's Hope, she also played the role of Emily Webb in the American Shakespeare Theater production of Our Town in Stratford, Connecticut. Mulgrew played ambitious country singer Garnet McGee in a November 1978 episode of Dallas. In 1979-80, she played Kate Columbo in Mrs. Columbo, a spin-off of the detective series Columbo, created specifically for her, which lasted 13 episodes.

In 1981, Mulgrew co-starred with Richard Burton and Nicholas Clay in the Arthurian love triangle Lovespell as Irish princess Isolt, who casts a spell on Mark, King of Cornwall, and his surrogate son, Tristan. During that same year, she co-starred with Pierce Brosnan in the six-hour miniseries about Irish immigrants in 19th century America called Manions of America. In 1985, she appeared in Remo Williams: The Adventure Begins in the role of Major Fleming. In 1986, she appeared in a run of Cheers episodes as Janet Eldridge. In 1987, she appeared in Throw Momma from the Train as Margaret, Billy Crystal's character's ex-wife.

In 1992, Kate appeared on Murphy Brown as Hillary Wheaton, a Toronto-based anchorwoman brought in to replace Murphy Brown during her maternity leave, but who turned out to have the same problem with alcoholism as Brown had previously dealt with at the beginning of the series.
Also in 1992, she played a guest-starring role as a soap-opera star who kills her bodyguard/lover and tries to cover it up, on Murder, She Wrote, episode number 170, titled "Ever After". Around the same time, she guest-starred in three episodes of Batman: The Animated Series as the terrorist Red Claw.

Star Trek: Voyager (1994–2001)

In 1994, Mulgrew received a call to take the part of Captain Kathryn Janeway in Star Trek: Voyager. She had auditioned for the role (originally named "Elizabeth Janeway") when producers announced casting. She initially submitted a video-taped audition, which she made in New York City in August 1994. Unhappy with this audition, she auditioned in person a few weeks later. That day, film actress Geneviève Bujold was selected to play Janeway (suggesting "Nicole" as the character's new first name), but she left the role after two days of filming, realizing that the amount of work required for an episodic television show was too demanding for her. Mulgrew was offered the role, which she accepted, later suggesting "Kathryn" as the character's final first name.

Mulgrew made history in the Star Trek franchise when she became the first female captain as a series regular in a leading role. Voyager was the first show broadcast on the new UPN channel, the only series renewed after the channel's first programming season, and its only show to run for seven seasons. Mulgrew won the Saturn Award for "Best TV Actress" in 1998 for her performances as Janeway.

Mulgrew voiced the character of Janeway for various Star Trek video games: Star Trek: Captain's Chair, a virtual-reality tour of various Starfleet vessels for home computers; the Star Trek: Voyager – Elite Force series; Star Trek: Legacy, which featured all of the captains up to that point (2006); and Star Trek Online.

About her years on Voyager, Mulgrew said:
I'm proud of it. It was difficult; it was hard work. I'm proud of the work because I think I made some minor difference in women in science. I grew to really love Star Trek: Voyager, and out of a cast of nine, I've made three great friends, I managed to raise two children. I think, "It's good. I used myself well."

Speaking about the best and worst part about playing a Star Trek captain, she said:
The best thing was simply the privilege and the challenge of being able to take a shot at the first female captain, transcending stereotypes that I was very familiar with. I was able to do that in front of millions of viewers. That was a remarkable experience—and it continues to resonate. The downside of that is also that it continues to resonate, and threatens to eclipse all else in one's long career if one does not up the ante and stay at it, in a way that may not ordinarily be necessary. I have to work at changing and constantly reinventing myself in a way that probably would not have happened had Star Trek not come along. I knew that going in, and I think that all of the perks attached to this journey have been really inexpressively great. So the negatives are small.
During Voyager, Mulgrew also played the role of Titania in the animated series Gargoyles (along with fellow Star Trek actors Marina Sirtis and Jonathan Frakes) and Victoria Riddler in the television film Riddler's Moon.

After Voyager and her subsequent Star Trek appearances finished, Mulgrew has continued to appear at various Star Trek conventions and events around the world.

Mulgrew returned to the role of Janeway as a training hologram in the series Star Trek: Prodigy.

After Voyager (2001–2012)

When Voyager came to an end after seven full seasons, Mulgrew returned to theater, and in 2003 starred in a one-woman play called Tea at Five, a monologue reminiscence based on Katharine Hepburn's memoir Me: Stories of My Life. Tea at Five was a critical success and Mulgrew received two awards, one from Carbonell (Best Actress) and the other from Broadway.com (Audience Award for Favorite Solo Performance). Mulgrew kept active in doing voice-over work for video games, most notably voicing the mysterious Flemeth in the Dragon Age video game series, a role she described as "delicious".

Mulgrew returned to television in 2006, guest-starring in an episode of Law & Order: Special Victims Unit. Mulgrew performed in The Exonerated at the Riverside Studios in London, England.

In early 2007, she appeared in the NBC television series The Black Donnellys as Helen Donnelly, which lasted for one season. She also performed the lead role in an off-Broadway production called Our Leading Lady written by Charles Busch in which she earned a nomination from the Drama League for her performance. Also in that year, Mulgrew played Clytemnestra in New York for Charles L. Mee's Iphigenia 2.0. She won the Obie Award for outstanding performance.

In June 2008, Mulgrew appeared in Equus on Broadway, playing Hesther Saloman, a public official who is empathetic toward the play's central character. The play opened on September 5, 2008, for a limited 22-week engagement through February 8, 2009. Also in 2008, Mulgrew filmed the 30-minute courtroom drama The Response, which is based on actual transcripts of the Guantanamo Bay tribunals. It was researched and fully vetted in conjunction with the University of Maryland School of Law and was shot in three days. Mulgrew portrays Colonel Sims and the other cast members, the crew, and she agreed to defer their salaries to cover the production costs. The film has been screened at a number of sites and is available on DVD.

In 2009, Mulgrew appeared in the NBC medical series Mercy, playing the recurring role of Jeannie Flanagan (the mother of the show's lead, Veronica). Released in 2010, the film The Best and Brightest, a comedy based in the world of New York City's elite private kindergartens, featured Mulgrew as the Player's wife. 

Also in 2010, she starred as Cleopatra in William Shakespeare's Antony and Cleopatra at Hartford Stage.

In 2011, Mulgrew appeared in the feature-length documentary The Captains. The film, written and directed by William Shatner, follows Shatner as he interviews each of the actors who succeeded him playing a lead-role Starfleet captain within the Star Trek franchise. During that same year, on another science-fiction series, she began a recurring guest-starring role on the third season of the series Warehouse 13, as the mother of one of the main characters.

From July 2011 to December 2013, Mulgrew appeared as the main cast member on Adult Swim's NTSF:SD:SUV:: as Kove, the leader of the titular terrorism-fighting unit and ex-wife of series lead Paul Scheer's character.

The Principle (2014) 

In 2014, Mulgrew narrated a documentary film, The Principle, that aims to promote the discredited idea of the geocentric model. Mulgrew said that she was misinformed as to the purpose of the documentary, going on to say "I am not a geocentrist, nor am I in any way a proponent of geocentrism... I do not subscribe to anything Robert Sungenis has written regarding science and history, and had I known of his involvement, would most certainly have avoided this documentary."

Orange Is the New Black (2013–2019)
Mulgrew starred as inmate Galina "Red" Reznikov in the Netflix original series Orange Is the New Black, the role for which she was nominated for her first Primetime Emmy Award in 2014. The popular character was re-signed for seasons two through seven. On working in the series, she was reunited with her Mercy co-star Taylor Schilling.

Personal life
Mulgrew became pregnant while acting in the lead role of Mary Ryan on Ryan's Hope. "I was single, alone, and flooded with terror. But I knew I would have that baby", Mulgrew said. She placed her daughter for adoption three days after giving birth in 1977, then in later years, searched for her. "The first man who wanted to explore this with me", said Mulgrew, "was Tim Hagan, who later became my husband". In 1998, Mulgrew received a call from the daughter she had placed for adoption. Her name is Danielle, and she had started searching for Mulgrew a year earlier. In her 2015 memoir Born with Teeth (which refers to Mulgrew having been born with a full set of neonatal teeth), Mulgrew tells of her reunion with her daughter in 2001. In 2019 Mulgrew released a second memoir titled How to Forget.

Mulgrew married Robert Egan in 1982. They have two children. The couple separated in 1993. Their divorce became final in 1995.

Mulgrew married Tim Hagan, a former Ohio gubernatorial candidate and a former commissioner of Cuyahoga County, Ohio, in April 1999. In an interview on April 15, 2015, Mulgrew stated that she and Hagan were divorced in 2014. 

Mulgrew is Catholic and an opponent of abortion and capital punishment. She received an award from Feminists for Life, an anti-abortion feminist group and is quoted as saying, "Execution as punishment is barbaric and unnecessary", "Life is sacred to me on all levels", and "Abortion does not compute with my philosophy." Following the U.S. Supreme Court's decision on Dobbs v. Jackson Women's Health Organization, Mulgrew released a statement saying that while "for myself, abortion was not an alternative... Choice is the fundamental right of every human being, especially women and people who are able to give birth".

Mulgrew is a rape survivor.

Mulgrew is a member of the National Advisory Committee of the Alzheimer's Association. Her mother, Joan Mulgrew, died on July 27, 2006 after a long battle with the disease.

Filmography

Film

Television

Theater

Video games

Awards and nominations

Publications

References

External links

 
 
 
 
 
 
 

1955 births
Living people
Actresses from Iowa
American Christian pacifists
American feminists
American film actresses
American people of Irish descent
American Shakespearean actresses
American soap opera actresses
American stage actresses
American television actresses
American video game actresses
American voice actresses
Catholics from Iowa
Obie Award recipients
People from Dubuque, Iowa
Spouses of Ohio politicians
Tisch School of the Arts alumni
20th-century American actresses
21st-century American actresses
21st-century American memoirists